Kevin Rutmanis (born October 17, 1958) is an American bass guitarist. He is of Latvian descent. Before getting into music, he was a student teacher. In late 1985, along with his younger brother Sandris Rutmanis, Thor Eisentrager, and then Jayhawks drummer Norm Rogers, he started the band The Cows.  After the dissolution of The Cows, Rutmanis was the bass guitar player for The Melvins from 1998 to 2005. He was also the bass guitarist in the supergroup Tomahawk featuring Mike Patton. Kevin played bass on  Tomahawk's first two long play releases, titled Tomahawk and Mit Gas, and played for two world tours supporting those albums. He has since recorded with Hepa-Titus.

Discography

Cows

1987 – Taint Pluribus Taint Unum
1989 – Daddy Has a Tail
1990 – Effete and Impudent Snobs
1991 – Peacetika
1992 – Cunning Stunts
1993 – Sexy Pee Story
1994 – Orphan's Tragedy
1996 – Whorn
1998 – Sorry in Pig Minor

Melvins

1999 – The Maggot
1999 – The Bootlicker
2000 – The Crybaby
2001 – Electroretard
2001 – Colossus of Destiny
2002 – Hostile Ambient Takeover
2004 – Pigs of the Roman Empire (with Lustmord)
2004 – Never Breathe What You Can't See (with Jello Biafra)
2005 – Sieg Howdy! (with Jello Biafra)
2013 – Everybody Loves Sausages (guest appearance)
2015 – "Dumb Numbers" Split Series
2016 – Three Men and a Baby (with Mike Kunka)

Tomahawk

2001 – Tomahawk
2003 – Mit Gas

Hepa/Titus
2011 - The Giving Brain
2012 - Follow Me
2014 - Gettin' It On
2016 - FM Warm Weather
2017 - Omega Pig
2018 - Champagne of Incest
2019 - Blue Fat Pussy

Teenage Larvae
1993 - Songs For Pigs
2017 - Omega Pig

References

American heavy metal musicians
American people of Latvian descent
American punk rock musicians
Post-hardcore musicians
Noise rock musicians
1958 births
Living people
Cows (band) members
Alternative metal bass guitarists
Tomahawk (band) members
Melvins members
20th-century American bass guitarists